America: A Personal History of the United States is a British 13-part documentary television series about the United States and its history, commissioned by the BBC and made in partnership with Time-Life Films. It was written and presented by Alistair Cooke, and first broadcast in both the United Kingdom and the United States in 1972. The producer was Michael Gill, who had the idea for the series and chose the presenter. A related book, Alistair Cooke's America, sold almost two million copies.

The series was a great success in both countries and was nominated for a Golden Globe Award and a BAFTA. It also resulted in Cooke's invitation to address the joint Houses of the United States Congress as part of the Bicentennial celebrations. Cooke said that, of all his work, America was what he was most proud of; it is the result and expression of his long love for the country. (Once, asked how long it took him to make the series, Cooke replied "I do not want to be coy, but it took 40 years.") He worked with Sir Denis William Brogan.

Episodes

References

External links 

Series Page on the BBC website
British Film Institute Screen Online

1972 British television series debuts
1973 British television series endings
1970s British documentary television series
BBC television documentaries
Television series about the history of the United States